Jeffrey Wilton Calhoun (born April 11, 1958) is an American former professional baseball middle relief pitcher who played from 1984 through 1988 in Major League Baseball (MLB) for the Houston Astros and Philadelphia Phillies. Listed at 6' 2", 190 lb., he batted and threw left-handed.

Born in LaGrange, Georgia, Calhoun attended University of Mississippi in Oxford, MS, where he pitched for the Ole Miss Rebels. He was selected by the Astros in the third round of the 1980 MLB Draft.

In Game 6 of the 1986 NLCS, against the New York Mets, Calhoun unleashed two wild pitches, a walk and an RBI-single, as the Astros lost 7–6 in 16 innings, in what was the longest postseason baseball game ever played at the time.

In 1987, Calhoun was sent by Houston to the Phillies in exchange for catcher Ronn Reynolds.

After baseball
Calhoun is now on the ministry staff of the Second Baptist Church in Houston, Texas, and also is a pitching coach for the school's high school baseball team.

Calhoun's daughter, Amber, plays volleyball for Texas State University. His son, Jay, is currently a pilot for Delta Connection carrier Endeavor Air.

Sources

External links

Jeff Calhoun at Pura Pelota (Venezuelan Professional Baseball League)

1958 births
Living people
20th-century Baptist ministers from the United States
Baseball players from Georgia (U.S. state)
Cardenales de Lara players
American expatriate baseball players in Venezuela
Columbus Astros players
Daytona Beach Astros players
Gulf Coast Astros players
Houston Astros players
Maine Guides players
Maine Phillies players
Major League Baseball pitchers
Ole Miss Rebels baseball players
Parklane Academy alumni
People from LaGrange, Georgia
Philadelphia Phillies players
Reading Phillies players
Baseball players from Houston
Tucson Toros players